Aldo Giuseppe Borel (30 May 191228 February 1979) was a French professional footballer who played as a midfielder.

Career
Throughout his career, Borel played for Italian clubs Torino, Casale, Fiorentina, Palermo, Juventus, Novara, Savona, and Omegna.

Personal life
Aldo's younger brother Felice Borel won the 1934 FIFA World Cup with the Italy national team, and their father Ernesto Borel played for OGC Nice, AS Cannes and Juventus F.C. in the 1900s and 1910s. To distinguish the brothers, Aldo was known as Borel I and Felice – as Borel II.

External links
 Career summary by playerhistory.com

1912 births
1979 deaths
Footballers from Nice
French footballers
French people of Italian descent
Association football midfielders
Serie A players
Serie C players
Torino F.C. players
Casale F.B.C. players
ACF Fiorentina players
Palermo F.C. players
Juventus F.C. players
Novara F.C. players